The SLW Ranch, formerly known as the Percheron-Norman Horse Ranch, is an historic ranch located approximately  east of Greeley, Colorado, near the confluence of the Platte River and Crow Creek. In 1998 it was honored by the Colorado Historical Society as a Centennial Ranch.

It was listed in the National Register of Historic Places in 1991.

The SLW Ranch is named for the three initial partners - S for John Studebaker of wagon and automotive manufacturing fame, L for Lafayette Lamb, a lumber company executive and W for Harvey E Witwer, former manager of the Percheron-Norman Horse Ranch and nephew of Studebaker.

History 
Studebaker and Lamb established the Percheron-Norman Horse Ranch in the 1880s on property purchased from “Lord” Lyulph Ogilvy, second son of the seventh Earl of Airlie. At one time the ranch was one of the largest horse operations in America, spanning  with 2,600 brood mares. In 1899 the SLW Ranch partnership was formed. In addition to the draft horses, the ranch was home to a small herd of white-faced cattle. Witwer continued to purchase Hereford cattle from ranches back East until the herd was 1,500 head. In order to promote strong healthy cattle with desirable traits, the herd was registered and began breeding operations.

In 1909 Witwer approached his partners with the idea of purchasing their shares in the ranch. The sale was completed in 1913, and over the course of the next few years the SLW Ranch operation switched exclusively to a cattle operation. The ranch is home to one of the oldest, continuously operating Hereford ranches in the country and the oldest registered Hereford herd in Colorado. Harvey Witwer and his wife Bertha had two sons, Stow Lathrop and Harvey E. Jr. and a daughter, Mary Frances. The sons became actively involved with operating the ranch and looked for ways to increase the stability and profitability of a somewhat volatile business.

In the 1920s, at Stow's urging, the ranch became a dude ranch. Visitors would come from all over for a taste of the western life on a real working ranch. The original 12 room Ogilvy home was converted to accommodations for guests, who by the 1930s were paying $35 a week for room, board and activities. The income from the dudes provided money when the cattle operation took a bad turn and the  ranch faced foreclosure. The ranch continued taking dudes until 1942 and is still operating cattle in 2008.

Witwer family 
As the sons became more active in the cattle operations, Harvey Witwer Sr. retired from ranching and entered politics in Weld County. In 1933 he was elected County Treasurer, an office he held until his death in 1942.

Stow married Clara Steele in 1926. They raised three children on the ranch, Joy (Witwer) Thomson, Carol (Witwer) Worth and Stow Witwer Jr.. Stow Sr and his family operated the ranch until his death in 1991. 

Harvey Jr. married Marion Giddings and they had two daughters, Julie (Witwer) Shade and Linda (Witwer) Bonnett.

Mary Frances married Alexander McLeish and they had twin sons, Doug and Don McLeish.

Opening in 2022 and located within the Hutchison Family Stockyards Event Center, the Stow L. Witwer Memorial Show Arena will honor the Witwer family’s legendary history with the National Western Stock Show.

See also
National Register of Historic Places listings in Weld County, Colorado

References 

Johnson, Edwin R. (May 1938). “H.E. Witwer and the SLW”. The Westerner, pp. 12, 13, 23.
Spohn, Donna (November 1983). “Stow Witwer: A Chat With An Old Cowhand”.  Choice Magazine of the Front Range, pp. 8–11, 19.
Kisling, Jack (July 27, 1986). “A Cattleman’s History: Stow Witwer at 83”. Empire, A magazine of the West, pp. 14, 16.

External links 
Colorado Centennial Farms 
Registry of Historical Places: Colorado Directory
Time Magazine: Lyulph Ogilvy


Buildings and structures in Weld County, Colorado
Historic districts on the National Register of Historic Places in Colorado
Ranches on the National Register of Historic Places in Colorado
National Register of Historic Places in Weld County, Colorado